Muni is a rural locality (a selo) and the administrative centre of Muninsky Selsoviet, Botlikhsky District, Republic of Dagestan, Russia. The population was 3,220 as of 2010. There are 45 streets.

Geography 
Muni is located 10 km northeast of Botlikh (the district's administrative centre) by road, on the Unsatlen River. Kvankhidatli is the nearest rural locality.

References 

Rural localities in Botlikhsky District